The first season of the American television series Batwoman premiered on The CW on October 6, 2019, and consisted of 20 episodes. The series is based on the DC Comics character Kate Kane / Batwoman, a costumed vigilante created by Geoff Johns, Grant Morrison, Greg Rucka, Mark Waid, and Keith Giffen, and is set in the Arrowverse, sharing continuity with other Arrowverse television series. The showrunner for this season is Caroline Dries.

Ruby Rose stars as Kate, and she is joined by main cast members Rachel Skarsten, Meagan Tandy, Nicole Kang, Camrus Johnson, Elizabeth Anweis and Dougray Scott. Rose previously appeared as a guest actor in the fifth annual Arrowverse crossover. Batwoman was picked up for a full season by The CW in October 2019, and filming took place primarily in Vancouver, British Columbia. Production was shut down in March 2020 due to the COVID-19 pandemic, leaving the season with only 20 of the planned 22 episodes.

The series premiere was watched by 1.86 million viewers and had a 0.5 18–49 demographic rating. It is the only season to feature Rose, who left the series ahead of the second season.

Episodes

Cast and characters

Main 

 Ruby Rose as Kate Kane / Batwoman
 Rachel Skarsten as Beth Kane / Alice
 Skarsten also portrayed an alternate version of Beth who was displaced from her native Earth during "Crisis on Infinite Earths" and appeared on Earth-Prime.
 Meagan Tandy as Sophie Moore
 Nicole Kang as Mary Hamilton
 Camrus Johnson as Luke Fox
 Johnson also portrays his Earth-99 counterpart.
 Elizabeth Anweis as Catherine Hamilton-Kane
 Dougray Scott as Jacob Kane

LaMonica Garrett also stars on "Crisis on Infinite Earths: Part Two" as Mar Novu / Monitor, a multiversal being who tests different Earths in the multiverse in preparation for an impending "crisis" orchestrated by his polar opposite, Mobius / Anti-Monitor.

Recurring 

 Greyston Holt as Tyler
 Brendon Zub as Chuck Dodgson
 Rachel Maddow as the voice of Vesper Fairchild
 Gabriel Mann as Tommy Elliot / Hush
 Brianne Howey as Reagan
 Christina Wolfe as Julia Pennyworth
 Sam Littlefield as Jonathan Cartwright / Mouse
 Rachel Matthews as Margaret "Margot"/ Magpie
 John Emmet Tracy as August Cartwright
 Sebastian Roché as Ethan Campbell
 Michelle Morgan as Gabrielle Kane
 Cameron McDonald as Jack Forbes
 Malia Pyles as Parker Torres

Guest

"Crisis on Infinite Earths"

Production

Development 
In May 2018, The CW president Mark Pedowitz and Arrow lead Stephen Amell announced at The CW's upfront presentation that Batwoman would be introduced in the Arrowverse series' 2018 crossover, "Elseworlds", which aired in December 2018, fighting alongside the other Arrowverse heroes, with Gotham City also appearing. In July 2018, it was reported that the CW was planning to develop a series around the character, to air in 2019 if picked up. The series, said to only be a "script-development deal", was written by Caroline Dries, who would also serve as an executive producer with Greg Berlanti, Sarah Schecter, and the character's co-creator Geoff Johns. The series would be produced by Berlanti Productions and Mad Ghost Productions in association with Warner Bros. Television. The following month, Pedowitz noted the pilot would be completed "for mid-season".

In December 2018, Dries submitted a "strong" script for a potential pilot episode, according to Nellie Andreeva of Deadline Hollywood. That led to the series receiving a pilot order from the CW the next month, to be considered for a series order in the 2019–20 television season. As of April 2019, the series was considered "a lock" at The CW, and reportedly had a writing staff in place. On May 7, 2019, The CW ordered the show to series. On October 25, 2019, the series was picked up for a full season of 22 episodes.

Writing 
The Batwoman origin story presented in the series is adapted from the Elegy comic book story arc. The events up to the fourth episode predate Batwoman's appearance in "Elseworlds", after which the events surpass the crossover.

Casting 
Casting for Kate Kane was expected to begin after the announcement of the intended series in May 2018, with the intention of casting an out lesbian actress. In August, Ruby Rose was cast as Kate Kane / Batwoman. In late January 2019, Meagan Tandy, Camrus Johnson, and Nicole Kang were cast in the series regular roles as Sophie Moore, Luke Fox, and Mary Hamilton, respectively. This was followed shortly by the casting of Rachel Skarsten as Alice, Dougray Scott as Jacob Kane, and Elizabeth Anweis as Catherine Hamilton-Kane. According to Kang, Mary and Catherine were not specifically written as being non-white, but Dries and Greg Berlanti decided to "reveal or explore more types of people who live" in Gotham City, so both characters were written as Asian Americans, keeping with the fact that both Kang and Anweis are Korean Americans.

The casting of Rose as Batwoman was met by backlash on social media and received intense criticism. DC Comics, which owns the rights to the longtime comic book superheroine Batwoman, reintroduced the character in 2006 as a lesbian of Jewish descent. Some online reactions attacked Rose for not being Jewish, while the main focus of the criticism was the assertion that the fact she identifies as gender fluid made her "not gay enough." Rose left Twitter and deactivated public commenting on her Instagram account following the backlash.

On August 21, 2019, Sam Littlefield was cast in a recurring role. In July, Burt Ward was cast for the Batwoman part in the 2019 Arrowverse crossover "Crisis on Infinite Earths". On October 4, 2019, Rachel Maddow and Sebastian Roché were cast in recurring capacities.

Filming 
Production on the pilot episode began on March 4 and concluded on March 25, 2019, in Vancouver, British Columbia. Additional filming took place in Chicago, Illinois. David Nutter had been chosen to serve as director and executive producer on the pilot in January 2019, but by mid-February, left the project for personal reasons. Nutter remained an executive producer on the episode, with Marcos Siega replacing him as director and also serving as an executive producer. Filming for the rest of the season began on July 4 and was set to conclude in mid-2020. On March 12, 2020, Warner Bros. Television shut down production on the series due to the COVID-19 pandemic. The season had one additional day of shooting on episode 20, which could not happen because of the shut down. Dries said they were "lucky" despite this, because the last day of filming concluded the "important" Alice/Mouse storyline, resulting in "a  solid episode" with what had been filmed.

Release

Broadcast 
The season debuted on October 6, 2019. It was originally set to run for 22 episodes, but as the 21st and 22nd episodes could not be filmed due to the COVID-19 pandemic, the 20th episode was announced as the finale.

Marketing 
On May 16, 2019, The CW released the first official trailer for the series. The trailer received a negative reaction on YouTube, with viewers accusing it of an overemphasis on feminism. The trailer received 86,000 "likes" compared to 428,000 "dislikes" by August 22, 2019. Comic Book  compared the backlash against a perceived agenda to that suffered by 2019's Captain Marvel and its actress Brie Larson. Alex Dalbey of The Daily Dot noted how the trailer received a range of angry reactions, but nonetheless felt that criticism of the trailer's focus on the protagonist being a woman was valid, which she found to be "forced" and "hamfisted" via the dialogue and choice of song. Dalbey also wrote: "It's 2019; we have Wonder Woman, Black Widow, Supergirl, Jessica Jones, Spider-Gwen, Captain Marvel and more. Batwoman isn't even the first lesbian superhero on the CW, there's also Thunder in Black Lightning." However, Jean Bentley of The Hollywood Reporter noted, "The character of Batwoman, aka Batman's cousin, Kate Kane, is the first lesbian superhero to headline her own series."

Reception

Ratings

Critical response 

On review aggregator Rotten Tomatoes, the season holds an approval rating of 80% based on 50 reviews, with an average rating of 6.87/10. The site's critical consensus reads, "Though it needs more time to develop its own identity to truly soar, Batwoman fun and stylish first season is a step in the right direction for representation and superhero shows alike." On Metacritic, the season has a weighted average score of 59 out of 100 based on reviews from 16 critics, indicating "mixed or average reviews".

Notes

References 

2019 American television seasons
2020 American television seasons
Batwoman (TV series) seasons
Television productions suspended due to the COVID-19 pandemic